Das Reich may refer to:

 2nd SS Panzer Division Das Reich
 Synonym for Deutsches Reich, often used as a universal term, translates to "The Empire or The Realm"
 Das Reich (newspaper), a National Socialist newspaper
 Das Reich, the main work of German right-wing intellectual Friedrich Hielscher (1932)
 Das Reich, a journal during the Weimar Republic (1930-33), edited by Friedrich Hielscher